Tashjian is a surname. Notable people with the surname include:

Elizabeth Tashjian (1912–2007), American artist
Janet Tashjian (born 1956), American writer
Julia Tashjian (1938–2013), American politician
Stephen Tashjian (born 1959), American artist